Bump is the surname of:

 Hulda Pierce Warren Bump and Mercy Lavinia Warren Bump, birth names of dwarf entertainers and sisters Minnie Warren (1849–1878) and Lavinia Warren (1841–1919) respectively, the latter the wife of "General Tom Thumb"

 Daniel Bump (born 1952), American mathematician
 Menzus R. Bump (1838–1913), American politician
 Nate Bump (born 1976), American Major League Baseball pitcher
 Suzanne M. Bump (born 1956), American politician and first female Massachusetts State Auditor